Sir Robert Scott,  (10 March 1903 – 28 May 1968) was a British colonial governor who served as the 27th Governor of Mauritius, 22 March 1954 to 10 July 1959. He wrote a history of the Islands called Limuria: The Lesser Dependencies of Mauritius

Scott was educated at Highgate School and Balliol College, Oxford, where he read Modern History.

He was appointed CMG in 1945, a Knight Bachelor in the 1953 New Year Honours, while he was Administrator at the East Africa High Commission, and KCMG in the 1954 Birthday Honours.

References 

1903 births
1968 deaths
People educated at Highgate School
Governors of British Mauritius
Knights Bachelor
Knights Commander of the Order of St Michael and St George